Azizul Hakim (born 15 May 1959) is a Bangladeshi television, film and stage actor.

Early life
Hakim was born in Comilla District to Md. Abdul Hakim, an engineer and Mohijunnesa. He joined the "Aranyak" theatre group from his student life.

Career
Hakim started his theatre career with the theatre group "Aranyak" in 1977. His first acted theatre play was Ora Kodom Ali. He then acted in Ora Ache Bolei, Iblish, Nankar Pala, Ginipig, Somotot, Coriolenus of "Aranyak" theatre group. His other notable theatre play were Payer Aoaj Shona Jay, Lok Soman Lok of "ITI", Talpatar Sepai of "Dhaka Podatik" theatre group, Shokuntola of "Dhaka Theatre", Songsoder Maa of "Padatik Natyadal", Agunmukha and Kirtonkhola. His last acted theatre play was Joyjoyonti. He became irregular in theatre after 1998 and concentrate of television. He started his television career acting in small roles in 1980s. His directorial debut on television was Ja Hariye Jay and on theatre was Pathor.

Hakim received his breakthrough as a television actor in 1981 with BTV's Akhaney Nongor. He then performed as Oli in the television drama serial Kon Kanoner Phul, directed by Fazrul Abedin Dulal and written by Imdadul Haq Milan. He debuted in directing mega-serial through Jol Porey Pata Norey (2005), written by his wife Zeenat.

Hakim debuted acting in film by the role of Mojnu in Mustafizur Rahman's Shonkhonil Karagar (1992), written by Humayun Ahmed. He later acted in Joyjatra (2004).

In February 2022, his first web film Redrum directed by Vicky Zahed Premiered on Chorki.

Works

Actor in television dramas

Director in television dramas

Films

Host in television programs
 Celebrity Show "Lizan Shudhui Adda" on Boishakhi TV in 2013 
 Live show on Channel 71 in 2014 on his birthday
 Live show "Aalap" on Boishakhi TV in 2014 on his birthday
 Live show "Citycell Tarokakathon" on Channel i in 2014 on his birthday

Awards and recognition
 Jay Jay Din Award (1994)
 Cultural Director Association Award (2001, 2002, 2003)
 Bangladesh Television Journalist Award (2002)
 Bangladesh Cultural Journalist Forum Award (2003)
 Bangla TV UK Ltd. Award (2004)

Personal life
Hakim is married to screenwriter Zeenat Hakim since 1993. They have one daughter Nazah Hakim and one son Muhaimeen Hakim.

References

External links
 
 

Living people
People from Comilla
Bangladeshi male film actors
Bangladeshi male stage actors
Bangladeshi male television actors
1959 births